Thanyalak Chotphibunsin (born November 19, 1990) is a Thai sport shooter. Chotphibunsin represented Thailand at the 2008 Summer Olympics in Beijing, where she competed in two rifle shooting events, along with her teammate Sasithorn Hongprasert. She placed fortieth out of forty-seven shooters in the women's 10 m air rifle, with a total score of 388 points. Nearly a week later, Chotphibunsin competed for her second event, 50 m rifle 3 positions, where she was able to shoot 200 targets in a prone position, 178 in standing, and 191 in kneeling, for a total score of 569 points, finishing only in thirty-fifth place.

References

External links

NBC 2008 Olympics profile

Thanyalak Chotphibunsin
Living people
Thanyalak Chotphibunsin
Shooters at the 2008 Summer Olympics
1990 births
Thanyalak Chotphibunsin
Asian Games medalists in shooting
Shooters at the 2006 Asian Games
Shooters at the 2010 Asian Games
Shooters at the 2014 Asian Games
Universiade medalists in shooting
Thanyalak Chotphibunsin
Thanyalak Chotphibunsin
Thanyalak Chotphibunsin
Thanyalak Chotphibunsin
Southeast Asian Games medalists in shooting
Medalists at the 2006 Asian Games
Shooters at the 2018 Asian Games
Competitors at the 2007 Southeast Asian Games
Universiade silver medalists for Thailand
Medalists at the 2013 Summer Universiade
Medalists at the 2015 Summer Universiade
Thanyalak Chotphibunsin